The Royal Dental Hospital of Melbourne (RDHM) is based in Carlton, just north of  Melbourne's CBD, and provides general, specialist and emergency dental care to all eligible Victorians. It is also a teaching hospital, which means patients may be treated by a variety of dental professionals, students, specialists in training, or other qualified staff.

History

Early history 
First established as the Melbourne Dental Hospital, the facility began treating patients on 12 September 1890 from its location at 225 Lonsdale Street, opposite the Melbourne Hospital.
The hospital was staffed by volunteer dentists – a result of tireless work by community-spirited dentist John Iliffe  
The hospital has relocated a number of times over the years. In 1897 it moved  to 189-191 Lonsdale Street where it shared a location with the Australian College of Dentistry. In 1907 the hospital moved to the newly built Australian College of Dentistry building at 193 Spring Street.

War years 
During the First World War, dental students at the Hospital gave up their lectures and worked 12-hour days to complete 5,000 fillings and 8,000 extractions, readying recruits for military service and giving free treatment to returned soldiers.
At the end of the Second World War the Hospital obtained ex-RAAF huts which it erected behind the Spring Street building and used as a prosthetics department. It wasn't until 1963 that Victoria's first government-funded dental hospital was built in Grattan Street, Parkville.

Name change and current location 
In 1969 the hospital's name was changed to The Royal Dental Hospital of Melbourne and, in 2003, it moved to its current location at 720 Swanston Street Carlton, opposite the University of Melbourne. It is now home to the Melbourne Dental School, the Henry Forman Atkinson Dental Museum, the RMIT University Department of Health and Biosciences, and the Cooperative Research Centre for Oral Health Science. It is operated by Dental Health Services Victoria which coordinates the delivery of public oral health services throughout Victoria on behalf of the Victorian Government's Department of Health.

Services 
The hospital provides a range of dental services to eligible members of the public including:
 Emergency dental care to all members of the general public;
 General care including fillings, dentures and preventative care to current healthcare and pensioner concession cardholders;
 Specialist dental care including orthodontics, oral and maxillofacial surgery, endodontics, periodontics, prosthodontics, pediatric dentistry and oral medicine; and
 Education of students from The University of Melbourne, RMIT University, and La Trobe University to educate Victoria's future oral health professionals. The hospital also provides bridging programs for overseas-trained clinicians seeking registration.

References

External links
 Dental Health Services Victoria
 Bachelor of Oral Health/Science undergraduate scholarship
 Dental graduate program

Hospitals in Melbourne
Hospital buildings completed in 2003
Hospitals established in 1890
1890 establishments in Australia
Organisations based in Australia with royal patronage
Buildings and structures in the City of Melbourne (LGA)